The Companies Act 1956 was an Act of the Parliament of India, enacted in 1956, which enabled companies to be formed by registration, and set out the responsibilities of companies, their directors and secretaries. It was repealed and replaced by the Companies Act 2013.

History
The Act was administered by the Government of India through the Ministry of Corporate Affairs and the Offices of Registrar of Companies, Official Liquidators, Public Trustee, Company Law Board, Director of Inspection, etc. The Registrar of Companies (ROC) handles incorporation of new companies and the administration of running companies.

Since its commencement, it was amended many times, in which amendment of 1988, 1990, 1996, 2000 , 2011 & 2013 were notable.

Types of companies
There are 11 types of registrations for a company under the Companies Act 1956.

 Private company
 Public company
 Companies limited by shares
 Companies limited by guarantee
 Unlimited company
 Section 25 company
 Government companies
 Foreign companies
 profitable or non profitable companies

See also
 Companies Act 2013

References

External links

 Text of the Companies Act, 1956

Acts of the Parliament of India 1956
Indian company law